Odirlei de Souza Gaspar (born 18 May 1981) is a retired Brazilian football player.

Honours
Individual
Liechtensteiner Footballer of the Year: 2007–08

References

External links
Brazilian FA Database 
FC Vaduz profile 
Career History at ASF

1981 births
Living people
Footballers from São Paulo (state)
Brazilian expatriate footballers
Brazilian expatriate sportspeople in Switzerland
Brazilian footballers
Esporte Clube São Bento players
1. FC Nürnberg II players
FC Lugano players
FC Vaduz players
AC Bellinzona players
FC Lausanne-Sport players
FC Chiasso players
FC Wohlen players
Swiss Super League players
Swiss Challenge League players
Expatriate footballers in Liechtenstein
Expatriate footballers in Germany
Expatriate footballers in Switzerland
Association football forwards
Brazilian expatriate sportspeople in Germany
Brazilian expatriate sportspeople in Liechtenstein